The following is a list of episodes of Junior MasterChef Pinoy Edition.  The finest young amateur chefs in the country battle in a kiddie cooking reality show hosted by Judy Ann Santos-Agoncillo and judged by world-renowned Filipino culinary experts Fern Aracama, Rolando Laudico, and JP Anglo. The show first aired on 27 August 2011 and ended on 18 February 2012.

Series overview

{| class="wikitable"
|-
! style="padding:0 8px;" rowspan="2" colspan="2"| Season(s)
! style="padding:0 8px;" rowspan="2"| Episodes
! style="padding:0 80px;" colspan="2"| Originally aired
|- 
! Season Premiere
! Season Finale
|- 
| style="background:#800517; color:#100; text-align:center;"| 
| style="text-align:center;"| 1
| style="text-align:center;"| 47
| style="text-align:center;"| 
| style="text-align:center;"| 
|-
|}

Season 1: 2011-2012
 Each kiddie cooks will go through four/five challenges to gain enough points to avoid the Elimination Round.
 Bea, Athena, Gino, Judel, Nadine, Louise, Tricia, Iain, Bianca, and Emman are back for the Wildcard Battle.

See also
List of programs broadcast by ABS-CBN Corporation
Junior MasterChef
MasterChef

References

Pinoy Edition Junior: list of episodes
Lists of Philippine television series episodes
Lists of reality television series episodes